Étienne Balibar (born 23 April 1942) is a French philosopher. He has taught at the University of Paris X-Nanterre, at the University of California Irvine and is currently an Anniversary Chair Professor at the Centre for Research in Modern European Philosophy (CRMEP) at Kingston University and a Visiting Professor at the Department of French and Romance Philology at Columbia University.

Life
Balibar was born in Avallon, Yonne, Burgundy, France in 1942, and first rose to prominence as one of Althusser's pupils at the École normale supérieure. He entered the École normale supérieure in 1960.

In 1961, Balibar joined the Parti communiste français. He was expelled in 1981 for critiquing the party's policy on immigration in an article.

Balibar participated in Louis Althusser's seminar on Karl Marx's Das Kapital in 1965. This seminar resulted in the book Reading Capital, co-authored by Althusser and his students. Balibar's chapter, "On the Basic Concepts of Historical Materialism," was republished along with those of Althusser in the book's abridged version (trans. 1970), until a complete translation was published in 2016.

In 1987, he received his doctorate degree in philosophy from the Katholieke Universiteit Nijmegen in the Netherlands. He received his habilitation from the Université Paris I in 1993. Balibar joined the University of Paris X-Nanterre as a professor in 1994, and the University of California, Irvine in 2000. He became Professor Emeritus of Paris X in 2002.

His daughter with the physicist Françoise Balibar is the actress Jeanne Balibar.

Work 
In Masses, Classes and Ideas, Balibar argues that in Das Kapital (or Capital), the theory of historical materialism comes into conflict with the critical theory that Marx begins to develop, particularly in his analysis of the category of labor, which in capitalism becomes a form of property. This conflict involves two distinct uses of the term "labor": labor as the revolutionary class subject (i.e., the "proletariat") and labor as an objective condition for the reproduction of capitalism (the "working class"). In The German Ideology, Marx conflates these two meanings, and treats labor as, in Balibar's words, the "veritable site of truth as well as the place from which the world is changed..."

In Capital, however, the disparity between the two senses of labor becomes apparent. One manifestation of this is the virtual disappearance in the text of the term "proletariat." As Balibar points out, the term appears only twice in the first edition of Capital, published in 1867: in the dedication to Wilhelm Wolff and in the two final sections on the "General Law of Capitalist Accumulation". For Balibar, this implies that "the emergence of a revolutionary form of subjectivity (or identity)... is never a specific property of nature, and therefore brings with it no guarantees, but obliges us to search for the conditions in a conjuncture that can precipitate class struggles into mass movements...". Moreover, "[t]here is no proof… that these forms are always and eternally the same (for example, the party-form, or the trade union)."

In "The Nation Form: History and Ideology," Balibar critiques modern conceptions of the nation-state. He states that he is undertaking a study of the contradiction of the nation-state because "Thinking about racism led us back to nationalism, and nationalism to uncertainty about the historical realities and categorization of the nation" (329).

Balibar contends that it is impossible to pinpoint the beginning of a nation or to argue that the modern people who inhabit a nation-state are the descendants of the nation that preceded it. Balibar argues that, because no nation-state has an ethnic base, every nation-state must create fictive ethnicities in order to project stability on the populace: 

"the idea of nations without a state, or nations 'before' the state, is thus a contradiction in terms, because a state always is implied in the historic framework of a national formation (even if not necessarily within the limits of its territory). But this contradiction is masked by the fact that national states, whose integrity suffers from internal conflicts that threaten its survival (regional conflicts, and especially class conflicts), project beneath their political existence to a preexisting 'ethnic' or 'popular' unity" (331)

In order to minimize these regional, class, and race conflicts, nation-states fabricate myths of origin that produce the illusion of shared ethnicity among all their inhabitants. In order to create these myths of origins, nation-states scour the historical period during which they were "formed" to find justification for their existence. They also create the illusion of shared ethnicity through linguistic communities: when everyone has access to the same language, they feel as if they share an ethnicity. Balibar argues that "schooling is the principal institution which produces ethnicity as linguistic community" (351). In addition, this ethnicity is created through the "nationalization of the family," meaning that the state comes to perform certain functions that might traditionally be performed by the family, such as the regulation of marriages and administration of social security. In recent work following the "populist" wave, Balibar has called the incorporation of these different elements "absolute capitalism."

Bibliography

Works in French 
 1965: Lire le Capital. With Louis Althusser et al.
 1974: Cinq Etudes du Matérialisme Historique.
 1976: Sur La Dictature du Prolétariat.
 1985: Spinoza et la politique.
 1988: Race, Nation, Classe. With Immanuel Wallerstein.
 1991: Écrits pour Althusser.
 1992: Les Frontieres De La Démocratie
 1993: La philosophie de Marx.
 1997: La crainte des masses: politique et philosophie avant et après Marx. (French version of Masses, Classes, Ideas, with extra essays)
 1998: Droit de cité. Culture et politique en démocratie.
 1998: John Locke, Identité et différence - L'invention de la conscience (Balibar's Monograph on John Locke)
 2001: Nous, citoyens d'Europe? Les frontières, l'État, le peuple.
 2003: L'Europe, l'Amérique, la Guerre. Réflexions sur la médiation européenne.
 2005: Europe, Constitution, Frontière.
 2010: La proposition de l'égaliberté.
 2010: Violence et Civilité: Wellek Library Lectures et autres essais de philosophie politique
 2011: Citoyen sujet et autres essais d'anthropologie philosophique
 2012: Saeculum : Culture, religion, idéologie
2015: Violence, civilité, révolution (edited volume about Balibar's work)
2016: Europe, Crise et fin ?
2016: Des Universels. Essais et conférences
2018: Spinoza politique. Le transindividuel (French version of Italian original, which appeared in 2002)

Selected translations 

 1970: Reading Capital (London: NLB). With Louis Althusser. Trans. Ben Brewster.
 1977: On the Dictatorship of the Proletariat (London: NLB). Trans. Grahame Lock.
 1991: Race, Nation, Class: Ambiguous Identities (London & New York: Verso). With Immanuel Wallerstein. Trans. Chris Turner.
 1994: Masses, Classes, Ideas: Studies on Politics and Philosophy Before and After Marx (New York & London: Routledge). Trans. James Swenson.
 1995: The Philosophy of Marx (London & New York: Verso). Trans. Chris Turner.
 1998: Spinoza and Politics (London & New York: Verso). Trans. Peter Snowdon.
 2002: Politics and the Other Scene (London & New York: Verso). Trans. Christine Jones, James Swenson & Chris Turner.
 2004: We, the People of Europe? Reflections on Transnational Citizenship (Princeton & Oxford: Princeton University Press). Trans. James Swenson.
 2013: Identity and Difference: John Locke and the Invention of Consciousness (London & New York: Verso). 
 2014: Equaliberty: Political Essays (Durham, NC: Duke University Press). Trans. James Ingram.
 2015: Violence and Civility: On the Limits of Political Philosophy (New York: Columbia University Press). Trans. G.M. Goshgarian.
 2015: Citizenship (Cambridge: Polity). Trans. Thomas Scott-Railton. 
 2017: Citizen Subject: Foundations for Philosophical Anthropology (New York: Fordham University Press). Trans. Steven Miller.
 2018: Secularism and Cosmopolitanism: Critical Hypotheses on Religion and Politics (New York: Columbia University Press). Trans. G. M. Goshgarian.
 2020: Spinoza, the Transindividual (Edinburgh: Edinburgh University Press). Trans. M.G.E. Kelly.

Online texts 
 Occasional Notes on Communism. In: Krisis: Journal for Contemporary Philosophy
 Theses for an Alter-Globalising Europe .
 Reading Capital (1968).
 Self-Criticism: Answers to Questions from Theoretical Practice (1973).
 On the Dictatorship of the Proletariat (1977).
 At The Borders Of Europe (1999).

References

Further reading 
 Stoler, Ann Laura (ed.), Thinking with Balibar: A Lexicon of Conceptual Practice, Fordham University Press, 2020. 
 Montag, Warren; Elsayed, Hanan (ed.), Balibar and the Citizen Subject, Edinburgh University Press, 2017. 
 Deleixhe, Martin, Etienne Balibar. L'illimitation démocratique, Michalon, 2014.
 Gaille, Marie; Lacroix, Justine et Sardinha, Diogo (ed.), "Pourquoi Balibar ?", Raison Publique, 2014.
 Hewlett, Nick, Badiou, Balibar, Rancière: Re-Thinking Emancipation, Continuum, 2010.
 Lacroix, Justine, La pensée française à l'épreuve de l'Europe, Grasset, 2008.
 Raynaud, Philippe, L'Extrême gauche plurielle. Entre démocratie radicale et révolution, Autrement, 2006.

External links

Archival collections 
 Guide to the Etienne Balibar Papers MS.C.023. Special Collections and Archives, The UC Irvine Libraries, Irvine, California.

Other 
 Selected bibliography (up to 1998).
 Review of We, the People of Europe? Reflections on Transnational Citizenship.
Anna-Verena Nosthoff, "Equaliberty: Notes on the Thought of Etienne Balibar", Critical Legal Thinking.
  Racisms, Migration & Citizenship in Europe: Etienne Balibar and Sandro Mezzadra in Conversation (Audio-English) - darkmatter Journal, 5 August 2007.
 intervention d'Etienne Balibar & Moishe Postone Congrès Marx International V : Altermondialisme/ anticapitalisme. Pour une cosmopolitique alternative. October 2007
 Debating with Alain Badiou on Universalism Opening statement, 2007 Koehn Event in Critical Theory. A dialogue between Alain Badiou and Etienne Balibar on "Universalism", University of California Irvine, 2 February 2007
 Etienne Balibar's Lecture Spinoza's Three Gods and the Modes of Communication at the Conference of the Birkbeck Institute for the Humanities Thinking with Spinoza: Politics, Philosophy and Religion, 7 & 8 May 2009 (podcast)
 For a phenomenology of cruelty;Interview with E.balibar
 http://nplusonemag.com/balibarism Bruce Robbins' "Balibarism!"
 http://heymancenter.org/events/thinking-with-balibar/ "Thinking with Balibar" Conference at Columbia University, fall 2014
 Wendy Brown, David Harvey, and Etienne Balibar at London Critical Theory Summer School – Friday Debate 2015  , and Wendy Brown, Costas Douzinas, Stephen Frosh, and Slavoj Zizek at London Critical Theory Summer School – Friday Debate 2012 .

1942 births
Living people
People from Avallon
École Normale Supérieure alumni
Academic staff of the University of Paris
University of California, Irvine faculty
French political philosophers
French historians of philosophy
Continental philosophers
French Marxists
Marxist theorists
20th-century French philosophers
French male writers
Spinoza scholars
Spinozist philosophers
French expatriates in the United Kingdom
French expatriates in the United States
21st-century French philosophers
Critics of political economy